WRAM 1330 AM is a radio station broadcasting a classic country format. Licensed to Monmouth, Illinois, the station serves Monmouth and the Galesburg area. WRAM is owned by Robbins-Treat Resources, LLC.

History
WRAM began broadcasting on May 5th 1957, and ran 1,000 watts during daytime hours only. It was owned by Prairieland Broadcasters. In 1971, the station was sold to Monmouth Broadcasting for $170,000. In 1977, it was sold to Coleman Broadcasting for $246,000. In 1986, the station was sold to KCD Enterprises for $325,000. In 1997, WRAM was sold to WPW Broadcasting, along with 97.7 WMOI, for $1.7 million.

On October 3, 2018, WPW Broadcasting announced a sale of their Monmouth stations WMOI, WRAM, and WRAM's translator at 94.1, to Monmouth-based Robbins-Treat Resources, LLC for $168,000. The sale was consummated on December 28, 2018

Translator
The station is also heard at 94.1 MHz, through a translator in Monmouth, Illinois.

References

External links
WRAM's website
WRAM 1330AM / 94.1FM Live Radio

Classic country radio stations in the United States
RAM
Radio stations established in 1957
1957 establishments in Illinois